Nord 3.1201 to 3.1290 was a class of 90 Pacific (4-6-2) type steam locomotive of the Chemins de Fer du Nord. They served in the north of France and Belgium. The first batch were built in 1923, and last remaining were retired from service in the 1960s. These locomotives were widely known as "Superpacifics" due to their high performance, which made them famous even in Britain.

Background
The locomotive therefore needed a tender able to hold 37 m³ of water and 8 tons of coal.

Design
The appearance was due to Gaston Schaeffer who grouped all the outside pipes together and ran them along the boiler. Their boilers were superb, which is the reason why André Chapelon later based some of his locomotive boilers on this design.

The locomotives were not equipped with mechanical stokers which made the job of the fireman harder as he had to throw the coal uniformly throughout the firebox. The cab was not enclosed, a characteristic found throughout the Chemins de Fer du Nord, and drivers gave it the nickname rendez-vous des courants d'air. The Nord specification tender was built to such a quality that the SNCF used the same design for its own tender locomotives twenty years later.

Construction history
The locomotives were built in three batches:—

Two locomotives, 3.1249 and 3.1250 were rebuilt by Nord's La Chapelle Works in 1934 as 2-cylinder simple locomotives. They were used in the Superpacific locomotive pool, but were withdrawn in 1945.

Numbering and livery
The class was numbered 3.1201 to 3.1290 before the nationalisation of the Chemins de Fer du Nord in 1938, and were the most prestigious locomotives of the company. They were painted in a dark brown livery with cream lining. The SNCF renumbered the rebuilt simple locomotives 231.D.1 and 231.D.2; while the others were renumbered 231.C.1 to 231.C.88

Career
The Superpacifics performed well for many years and were only surpassed by André Chapelon's 231 Pacific locomotive, copied from the 231 D Ouest engines of the Chemins de Fer de l'État.  The last few examples were withdrawn from service during the 1960s.  Chapelon often said that the only modification he had made to the design was the fitting of a Kylchap blastpipe, thus enhancing smoke ejection. (The Kylchap was named so due to the names of its creators, Kylälä and Chapelon.)

The engine is also famous due to a 1:87 HO railway model reproduced made by Jouef in the 1960s.

Notes

3.1201
4-6-2 locomotives
Railway locomotives introduced in 1923
Compound locomotives
Passenger locomotives
Standard gauge locomotives of France
ANF locomotives
2′C1′ h4v locomotives